Maître Pierre (Master Pierre) is an uncompleted project by Charles Gounod, intended as his twelfth opera and planned in the summer of 1877 with the librettist Louis Gallet. The "Master Pierre" of the title was Pierre Abélard, the twelfth century scholar-philosopher and lover of Heloise.

The question of how Abelard's castration would be handled was a subject of ribald speculation in the press; when Hanslick pressed it Gounod explained that he was murdered at the end of the fourth act, his ghost visiting Héloïse in the last act.

Although the opera was half orchestrated by summer of 1878, Gounod abandoned the work to begin Le tribut de Zamora.   The  music was later arranged by the composer as a Suite dramatique en quatre parties; the full score is preserved in the Bibliothèque nationale.   In 1904 Gounod's widow asked Camille Saint-Saëns to complete the fifth act.    He supplied recitatives to connect the existing numbers, and in 1939 Reynaldo Hahn conducted a concert performance of the final tableau: "du grand Gounod" was one judgment.

References

Operas by Charles Gounod
Unfinished operas